Administrative policies of Ali ibn Abi Talib highlights the policies of Ali, the son-in-law and cousin of the Islamic prophet Muhammad. Ali is the first Shia Imam and was the fourth Rashidun caliph, after Abu Bakr, Umar, and Uthman. He was acclaimed as the caliph in 656 after the assassination of his predecessor Uthman, who was killed by Egyptian rebels amidst widespread accusations of nepotism, injustice, and corruption. Ali undertook radical changes upon accession and his strictly egalitarian policies garnered him the support of underprivileged groups while alienating the powerful Quraysh tribe, some of whom revolted against Ali under the pretext of revenge for Uthman in the Battle of the Camel (656) and the protracted Battle of Siffin (657). The latter fight ended in arbitration and led to the creation of the Kharijites, a member of whom is thought to be responsible for the assassination of Ali in 661 during the morning prayers. For some, the brief caliphate of Ali was characterized by his honesty, his unbending devotion to Islam, his equal treatment of the supporters, and his magnanimity towards his defeated enemies, while others criticize his policies for idealism and the absence of political expediency.

Justice 
Laura Veccia Vaglieri describes Ali as deeply devoted to the cause of Islam, and her view is echoed by some others. The brief caliphate of Ali was thus characterized by his strict justice, as suggested by Reza Shah-Kazemi, Wilferd Madelung, Moojan Momen, Mahmoud M. Ayoub, John Esposito, and Hassan Abbas, among others. In his inaugural speech, Ali rebuked Muslims for straying from the straight path after Muhammad, and added that their ranks must be turned around to bring forth the virtuous and send back the unworthy. He promised there to repossess the public lands gifted by Uthman during his caliphate. 

Intent on restoring his vision of the prophetic governance, Ali thus undertook radical policies, which the Shia Muhammad H. Tabatabai describes as "revolutionary." The caliph immediately dismissed nearly all the governors who had served Uthman, saying that the likes of those men should not be appointed to any office. He replaced them with men whom he considered pious, largely from the Ansar and the Banu Hashim. Ali also distributed the treasury funds equally among Muslims, following the practice of Muhammad. He is said to have shown zero tolerance for corruption, as apparent from his instructions for his commander Malik al-Ashtar, and also from his letters of warning to his official Ziyad ibn Abihi and his cousin Ibn Abbas. Some of those affected by these policies soon revolted against Ali under the pretext of revenge for Uthman. Among them was Mu'awiya, the incumbent governor of Syria.      

Veccia Vaglieri criticizes Ali for "excessive rigorism," saying that he lacked political flexibility. Wilferd Madelung similarly views the above policies of Ali as an indication of his political naivety and unwillingness to compromise his principles for political expediency. Mahmoud M. Ayoub says that Ali was not politically naive but idealistic, adding that the uncompromising uprightness of Ali and his strictly egalitarian policies alienated the Arabs and the powerful Quraysh tribe, in particular. Both authors, however, concede that these qualities of Ali also turned him into a paragon of Islamic virtues for his followers. In his defense, Tabatabai and Ayoub propound that Ali ruled with righteousness rather than political flexibility. Political flexibility was nevertheless a quality of Muhammad, according to Ayoub. His view is rejected by Tabatabai who asserts that Islam never allows for compromising on a just cause, quoting verse 68:9, "They wish that thou might compromise and that they might compromise." To support his view, Tabatabai notes that Muhammad repeatedly rejected calls for peace from his enemies in return for leaving their gods alone. Shah-Kazemi similarly says that Muhammad appointed some of his erstwhile enemies to leadership positions to give them an opportunity to prove their conversion to Islam, without compromising his principles. In contrast, confirming those whom Ali dismissed would have been tantamount to overlooking their corruption and undermining the moral basis of his caliphate. Ali Bahramian proposes that replacing the governors was the only available course of action for Ali, both on principle and in practice. He writes that injustice was the main grievance of the provincial rebels and they would have turned against Ali had he confirmed Uthman's governors. This is echoed by Shah-Kazemi, who adds that the equal distribution of the state wealth by Ali was a necessary change to address the inevitable societal impacts of the gross inequalities created under Umar and Uthman.

Religious authority 
Ali viewed himself not only as the temporal leader of the Muslim community but also as its exclusive religious authority. This is evident in his inaugural speech as the caliph, writes Madelung, while Hugh N. Kennedy adds that Ali saw the ruler as a charismatic figure who guides the Islamic community. Ali thus laid claim to the religious authority to interpret the Quran and Sunnah, and particularly the esoteric message of the script. Ali is reported by al-Tabari to have said, "We fought against them on the exoteric content of the revelation and today we are fighting them for its esoteric message." This claim of Ali distinguished him from his predecessors who may be viewed as merely the administrators of the divine law.

In return, some supporters of Ali indeed held him as their divinely-guided leader who demanded the same type of loyalty that Muhammad did. These felt an absolute and all-encompassing bond of spiritual loyalty to Ali that transcended politics. The existence of this group is evidenced by Sunni and Shia reports from the Battle of Siffin (657) and some literary works dating to the First Fitna (656-661). After the Kharijites broke with Ali, some forty-thousand of his supporters offered him a second  and pledged to be friends to the friends of Ali and enemies to his enemies. The ranks of these devoted supporters included the Ansar and the tribes from southern Arabia, according to Maria M. Dakake. It is also likely that many of these supporters viewed Ali as the legatee of Muhammad and thus his rightful successor after his death, as evidenced in the poetry from the period. The word  also appears in Malik's address at the inauguration of Ali in Tarikh al-Ya'qubi. Dakake rejects this link, saying that the term was widely used among the supporters of Ali by the time of the Battle of Siffin. Husain M. Jafri has a similar view. At the same time, the Shia representation of Abu Bakr and Umar as usurpers of Ali's rights is absent from the (Sunni) historical discourse.

Fiscal policies 

Ali opposed centralized control over provincial revenues. He also equally distributed the taxes and booty amongst Muslims, following the precedent of Muhammad and Abu Bakr. Ayoub and Jafri write that Ali distributed the content of the treasury of Kufa every Friday. This practice may indicate the egalitarian views of Ali, who thus attempted to unravel the social order established under his predecessors: Umar distributed the state revenues according to perceived Islamic merit and precedence, which nevertheless led to class differences in the Islamic community, placing the Quraysh above the rest of Arabs, and Arabs above non-Arabs. Umar apparently later came to regret this system, which replaced the Quranic principle of equality among the faithful. In turn, Uthman was widely accused of nepotism and corruption. During his caliphate, the tribal elites returned to power at the cost of the early Muslims.  

The departure of Ali from the status quo on the distribution of revenues particularly appealed to the late immigrants to Iraq, among whom were the non-Arab converts in Kufa, for whom Ali championed a universalist vision of Islam which offered them equal rights. This latter group of early Muslims were interested in restoring the social order of Umar and saw Ali as their best hope for achieving that. In contrast, Talha and Zubayr were both Qurayshite companions of Muhammad who had amassed immense wealth under Uthman. They both revolted against Ali after the caliph refused to grant them favors. Some other figures among the Quraysh also turned against Ali for the same reason, write Ayoub and John McHugo. Ali is said to have even rejected a request by his brother Aqil for public funds, whereas Mu'awiya readily offered all of them bribes. By comparison, Ali continued to pay the Kharijites their shares from the treasury after they rose against him. Regarding taxation, Ali instructed his officials to collect payments on a voluntary basis and without harassment, and to prioritize the poor when distributing the funds. Ali was concerned with agriculture, suggests Ann Lambton, and instructed Malik al-Ashtar in a letter to pay more attention to land development than short-term taxation.

Islamic sciences 
Tabatabai contends that the Islamic sciences were largely overlooked during the Muslim conquests, with the immense material wealth they brought. He adds that it was also forbidden after Muhammad to commit his sayings (s) to writing, citing the Sunni al-Tabari and Ibn Sa'd. In contrast, Ali used his rule to disseminate Islamic sciences, writes Tabatabai,  pioneering Arabic grammar and Islamic metaphysics.  Shah-Kazemi suggests that the public sermons attributed to Ali in Nahj al-balagha go beyond addressing the basic ethical and religious needs of the Muslim community, for they are replete with higher esoteric teachings. To show the dedication of Ali to knowledge, Shah-Kazemi highlights his answer during the Battle of the Camel (656) to a question about the oneness of God, "That which has no second (God) does not enter into the category of number." Ali also trained students, among whom are the first scholars in jurisprudence, theology, Quranic exegesis and recitation, and also the forefathers of Sufism, including Uways al-Qarani, Kumayl ibn Ziyad, Maytham al-Tammar, Roshaid al-Hajari, Hasan al-Basri, and al-Rabi' ibn Khaytham.

Rules of war 

Ali is regarded as an authority on the rules of intra-Muslim war in Islamic jurisprudence. He forbade Muslim fighters from looting, and instead equally distributed the taxes as salaries among the warriors. This ruling probably became a subject of dispute between Ali and those who later formed the Kharijites. Before the Battle of the Camel (656), Ali also forbade chasing the fugitives, killing the prisoners, and dispatching the wounded. With these rulings, Ali thus recognized the rebels' rights as Muslims, even though they might be considered a threat to order. Ali also pardoned them in victory, and these practices were soon enshrined in the Islamic law, for instance in the rulings of the prominent Sunni Muhammad al-Shaybani about rebellions. Beyond these measures, Ali has often been noted for his magnanimity to his defeated foes. He also advised al-Ashtar not to reject any call to peace and not to violate any agreements, and warned him against unlawful shedding of blood. He forbade his commanders from disturbing the civilians except when lost or in dire need of food. He further urged al-Ashtar to resort to war only when negotiations fail. He also ordered him to avoid commencing hostilities, and this Ali observed too in the Battle of the Camel and the Battle of Nahrawan (658). Ali barred his troops from killing the wounded and those who flee, mutilating the dead, entering homes without permission, looting, and harming the women. Veccia Vaglieri adds that Ali prevented the enslavement of women and children in victory, even though some protested. Prior to the Battle of Siffin (657) with Mu'awiya, Ali did not retaliate and allowed his enemies to access drinking water when he seized control of the source of water. In the opinion of Kelsay, comments by Ali and his practices indicate that he saw reconciliation as the final aim of intra-Muslim warfare, in line with verses 49:9-10 of the Quran.

Austerity 
Ali lived an austere life, and strictly separated his public and private spending. Hassan Abbas writes that Ali had a simple diet and mended his own things. In a letter to Uthman ibn Hunayf attributed to Ali, the governor of Basra is admonished for accepting an invitation to a banquet, asking how he could go to bed with his belly full, while there were people around him who are hungry. Also ascribed to Ali is the saying, "God has made it incumbent on true leaders to make themselves commensurable with the weakest people over whom they rule, so that the poverty of the poor will not engender covetousness." When he relocated to Kufa, as the new de-facto capital, Ali refused to reside in the governor's castle, says Madelung, calling it . Instead, he stayed with his nephew Ja'da ibn Hubayra, or in a small house next to the mosque. According to al-Ya'qubi, "Ali never wore a new garment, never acquired a state, never set his heart on wealth, and used his assets for giving alms to the needy people." The view of Shah-Kazemi is that Ali respected private property rights but did not allow the rich to add to their wealth at the expense of the poor. To justify this policy, Shah-Kazemi cites verse 59:7, which warns Muslims about their wealth "circulating only among the rich."

Minorities 
Shah-Kazemi believes that Ali upheld the freedom of speech in his tolerance of the Kharijites as long as their protests remained peaceful. When some encouraged him to punish the Kharijites, Ali said that he would defend himself with his words as long they attacked him with words, with his hands if they attacked him with their hands, and with his sword only if they attacked him with their swords. A similar report is given by al-Shaybani, who also adds another report: Sawwar al-Manquri was brought to Ali for publicly cursing and threatening to kill him, Ali released the former. When the narrator apparently objected to this, Ali explained, "Shall I kill him even though he has not [yet] killed me?" The narrator then added that Sawwar had cursed the caliph, to which Ali replied that the former should then curse Sawwar or leave him alone. These reports set the precedent in Islamic law for a commensurate response to opposition, writes Kelsay. Unless the rebel party actually resorts to violence, the caliph must refrain from use of force. It is not even enough to know that the rebels intend to attack. There are indications that Ali considered the religious minorities legally equal to non-Muslims, reputedly setting the same blood money for all citizens, regardless of their faith.

Welfare state 
Ali took some early measures toward the establishment of a welfare state. In his letter to al-Ashtar, Ali urged his commander to prioritize the needy, the afflicted, and the disabled, to assign a deputy to oversee their needs, and to attend to them personally. Shah-Kazemi includes the account of an encounter between Ali and an old beggar. He gave the man a regular stipend from the treasury and reprimanded those in the neighborhood, "You have employed him to the point where he is old and infirm, and now you refuse to help him."

Praise 
The Sunni Ahmad ibn Hanbal famously said that Ali adorned the caliphate. Linda Jones holds the caliphate of Ali as a model for socio-political and religious righteousness that defies worldly corruption and social injustice. John Esposito has a similar view. Madelung writes that the caliphate of Ali was characterized by his honesty, his unbending devotion to Islam, his equal treatment of the supporters, and his magnanimity towards his defeated enemies. Moojan Momen and Veccia Vaglieri share similar opinions. The latter adds that Ali fought against those whom he perceived as erring Muslims as a matter of duty, in order to uphold Islam. Shah-Kazemi says that Ali strived for justice and compassion for all, regardless of their religion. Ismail Poonawala writes that the sources are unanimous about the devotion of Ali to the cause of Islam and the rule of justice in accordance with the Quran and the Sunnah. Muhammad al-Buraey views the instructions of Ali for his governor of Egypt as a model for just Islamic governance, "where justice and mercy is shown to human beings irrespective of class, creed and color, where poverty is neither a stigma or disqualification and where justice is not tarred with nepotism, favoritism, provincialism or religious fanaticism." A similar view is voiced by Shah-Kazemi.

Popular accounts 
There are popular accounts and anecdotes about the caliphate of Ali and his character, some of which are summarized below:

 Ibn Abi'l-Hadid quotes Sa'sa'a ibn Sohan, a companion of Ali, as saying, "He [Ali] was among us as one of our own, of gentle disposition, intense humility, leading with a light touch, even though we were in awe of him with the kind of awe that a bound prisoner has before one who holds a sword over his head."
 Uthman ibn Hunayf warned Ali that the equal distribution of the state revenues would alienate Arab nobles, who might turn to Mu'awiya, while the poor, the disabled, the widows, and the slaves, who benefited from the new policy, would not bring Ali any political advantage. Ali is reported to have responded that he was happy about the deserters (implying that those who prioritized material gains did not belong to his camp). As for the poor, Ali said his aim was to serve them by upholding their rights rather than benefit from them politically. 
 When Ali was visited by private guests one evening at work, he turned off the candle and lit another one. When asked about it, he explained that the first candle was paid for by public funds while the latter was his own.
 A sermon attributed to him in Nahj al-balagha mentions how Ali spared the life of Amr ibn al-As, the top enemy commander, when the latter exposed himself to Ali on the battlefield of Siffin in an attempt to save his life.

Footnotes

References

 
 
 

 

 

 

 
 
 
 
 
 
 

 

 
 
 
 
 

Ali
7th-century conflicts